Lioholus is a genus of beetles in the family Carabidae, containing the following species:

 Lioholus jedlickai Lafer, 1989
 Lioholus metallescens Tschitscherine, 1897

References

Harpalinae